1981 in the Philippines details events of note that happened in the Philippines in the year 1981.

Incumbents

 President: Ferdinand Marcos  (KBL)
 Prime Minister:
 Ferdinand Marcos  (KBL) (until June 30)
 Cesar Virata  (KBL) (starting June 30)
House Speaker: Querube Makalintal
 Chief Justice: Enrique Fernando

Events

January
 January 17 – Martial Law is lifted by President Marcos.

February
 February 12 – At least 119 military officers are massacred in Pata Island, Sulu.
 February 17–22 – First papal visit of Pope John Paul II in the country; during the visit, he beatified Lorenzo Ruiz.
 February 26 – A U.S. Air Force C-130 plane crashes into the South China Sea, near Subic Bay Naval Base, killing 23 of 24 American, Philippine, Australian, and New Zealand military personnel aboard.

April
 April 7 – National and local plebiscites are held. The majority of the Filipino people voted yes to the terms and constitutional amendments. All were in favor of the creation of the new municipalities in Bohol, South Cotabato and Zamboanga del Norte provinces.

June
 June 16 – Presidential elections are held. Incumbent Ferdinand E. Marcos of the Kilusang Bagong Lipunan (KBL) defeats former Gen. Alejo Santos of the Nacionalista Party in a landslide victory garnering 88% of the votes. Most opposition parties boycott the elections as a sign of protest over the 1978 elections for an interim Batasang Pambansa (National Assembly) which they condemned as fraudulent.

July
 July 1 – Tropical Storm Kelly lashes through the islands, killing 120 people in floods and mud slides.

September
 September 20 – The Philippine Navy destroyer 'Datu Kalantlaw' runs aground, killing at least 40 sailors.

November
 November 17 – Manila Film Center collapses, killing 169 workers.
 November 24 – Typhoon Irma batters the northern part of the island of Luzon, killing more than 50 people.

December
 December 26 – Typhoon Lee sweeps across the Philippines, killing 50 people and leaving nearly 200,000 homeless.

Holidays

As per Act No. 2711 section 29, issued on March 10, 1917, any legal holiday of fixed date falls on Sunday, the next succeeding day shall be observed as legal holiday. Sundays are also considered legal religious holidays. Bonifacio Day was added through Philippine Legislature Act No. 2946. It was signed by then-Governor General Francis Burton Harrison in 1921. On October 28, 1931, the Act No. 3827 was approved declaring the last Sunday of August as National Heroes Day. As per Republic Act No. 3022, April 9th was proclaimed as Bataan Day. Independence Day was changed from July 4 (Philippine Republic Day) to June 12 (Philippine Independence Day) on August 4, 1964.

 January 1 – New Year's Day
 February 22 – Legal Holiday
 April 9 – Araw ng Kagitingan (Day of Valor)
 April 16 – Maundy Thursday
 April 17 – Good Friday
 May 1 – Labor Day
 June 12 – Independence Day 
 July 4 – Philippine Republic Day
 August 13  – Legal Holiday
 August 30 – National Heroes Day
 September 21 – Thanksgiving Day
 November 30 – Bonifacio Day
 December 25 – Christmas Day
 December 30 – Rizal Day

Entertainment and culture

Sports
 December 6–15 – Philippines hosts the 11th Southeast Asian Games for the first time in Manila. The country ranks third with an overall total of 187 medals.

Births
 January 5 – Kyla, actress, singer, host
 January 19: 
Paolo Bugia, basketball player
Kerby Raymundo, basketball player
 February 1 – Jay-R, actor, singer, host
 February 26 – Assunta De Rossi, actress, model
 March 4 – Carol Banawa, actress, singer, host
 March 7 – Rica Peralejo, actress
 March 22:
 Karylle, actress, host
 Mark Andaya, actor and basketball player
 April 21:
 Luis Manzano, actor, host
 Kathleen Hermosa, actress
 Cindy Kurleto, Austrian model and actress
 May 5 – Paul Artadi, basketball player
 May 12 – Dennis Trillo, actor
 June 10 – Arwind Santos, basketball player
 June 15 – James Blanco, actor, model
 June 20 – Maricar Reyes, Filipina actress, endorsement
 June 23 – Mikey Bustos, singer, comedian, and YouTube content creator
 June 28 – Angela Lagunzad, Journalist, news anchor
 July 3 – Empoy Marquez, singer, actor, model, endorsement, comedian
 July 31 – M.C. Caceres, basketball player
 August 5 – Tanya Garcia, actress
 August 30 – Antoinette Taus, actress, singer, host, model
 September 14 – Patrick Garcia, actor
 October 15 – Ronald Tubid, basketball player
 October 16 – Marc Pingris, basketball player
 October 17 – Paul Soriano, film director and producer
 October 19 – Christian Bautista, actor, singer, host
 October 20 – Isabel Oli, actress, model
 October 24 – Alfred Vargas, actor, model, politician
 October 29 – Angelika Dela Cruz, actress and politician
 November 1:
 Mark Borboran, basketball player 
 Coco Martin, actor producer and VTR commercial voice endorsement
 November 13 – Mark Cardona, basketball player
 November 18:
 Gian Magdangal, singer and actor
 Dianne dela Fuente, singer and actress
 December 8 – Ranidel de Ocampo, basketball player
 December 11: 
 Lani Cayetano, politician

Deaths
 March 22 – Gil Puyat, Filipino businessman and politician, Senator of the Philippines and Senate President (b. 1907)
 July 6 – Fort Acuña, professional basketball player and coach (b. 1948)
 July 25 – Gerardo de León, film director and actor (b. 1913)
 December 30 – Alfie Anido, actor (b. 1959)

See also
1981 in Philippine television

References